Ishmael Yartey (born 11 January 1990) is a Ghanaian professional footballer who plays as a left midfielder or left winger who plays for Bahrain Premier League side Al Hidd Club.

Club career
Yartey began his youth and professional career with Ghanaian club All Blacks F.C., before joining S.L. Benfica on a one-year loan deal with a buy option at the end of the contract. Former Benfica manager Quique Flores was the first manager that called Yartey to train with the senior squad, but he never debuted for the first team.

On 15 July 2009, Yartey left Benfica and signed a one-year loan deal with S.C. Beira Mar. At the end of the season he signed for C.D. Fátima, on another one-year loan. In January 2011 he was loaned to Beira-Mar for a second time, for the remainder of the 2010–11 Primeira Liga season.

On 21 June 2011, he was again loaned, this time to Servette F.C. of the Swiss Super League until the end of the 2011–12 Swiss Super League.

On 19 July 2012, after returning to Benfica from his Servette loan, Yartey signed a four-year contract with French Ligue 1 club FC Sochaux-Montbéliard.

On 26 March 2015, Yartey signed a loan contract with Portland Timbers of MLS with a transfer option from French Ligue 1 club FC Sochaux-Montbéliard.

Yartey completed his move to Finnish top-flight side KPV Kokkola in July 2019. He scored on his competitive debut for KPV. He was voted the MVP on his debut game for KPV. Yartey also won the Man of the Match Award against giants HJK Helsinki.

. In that game he scored a wonderful goal for KPV.

In January 2020, Yartey signed for Saudi side Hetten FC.

In February 2021, Yartey signed for Finland Veikkausliiga side FC Haka. He scored two goals in March 2021 in pre-season friendly games for Haka. In January 2022, Yartey signed for Bahrain Premier League side Al Hidd Club after leaving Haka.

International career
Yartey represented Ghana U-17 (Black Starlets) in the 2007 FIFA U-17 World Cup in Korea Republic.

On 16 May 2012, Yartey was called up for two of the Ghana national team's 2014 FIFA World Cup qualifications, against Lesotho in Kumasi, Ashanti, Ghana, and on 1 June 2012 and against Zambia in Ndola, Copperbelt Province, Zambia, on 9 June 2012.

Career statistics

Honours
Beira-Mar
Segunda Liga: 2009–10

Portland Timbers
MLS Cup: 2015
Western Conference: 2015

References

External links
 In depth Interview October 2009
 
 
 

1990 births
Living people
Ghanaian footballers
Ghanaian expatriate footballers
S.L. Benfica footballers
S.C. Beira-Mar players
All Blacks F.C. players
Servette FC players
FC Sion players
Portland Timbers players
FC Sochaux-Montbéliard players
C.D. Fátima players
Gil Vicente F.C. players
FC Stade Nyonnais players
Kokkolan Palloveikot players
Hetten FC players
Primeira Liga players
Swiss Super League players
Ligue 1 players
Championnat National 2 players
Major League Soccer players
Liga Portugal 2 players
Swiss Promotion League players
Veikkausliiga players
Saudi First Division League players
Association football midfielders
Association football forwards
Expatriate footballers in Portugal
Expatriate footballers in Switzerland
Expatriate footballers in France
Expatriate soccer players in the United States
Expatriate footballers in Finland
Expatriate footballers in Saudi Arabia
Ghanaian expatriate sportspeople in Portugal
Ghanaian expatriate sportspeople in Switzerland
Ghanaian expatriate sportspeople in France
Ghanaian expatriate sportspeople in the United States
Ghanaian expatriate sportspeople in Finland
Ghanaian expatriate sportspeople in Saudi Arabia